The Face of Furry Creek is a television series produced by MKW Productions that stars writer/comedian Mark Kenneth Woods, actors Michael Venus, Amy Goodmurphy and Ryan Steele as multiple characters competing in a small mountain town reality-show type contest. It was created by Woods and the series premiered on OUTtv on June 3, 2013 in the network's coveted Monday night 9pm time slot previously held by Season 5 of RuPaul's Drag Race.

The comedy series was conceived as a hybrid television series and online digital project. It was shot in the style of reality television and includes a fictional contest website with additional media not seen on television.

The Face of Furry Creek debuted to  critical acclaim with Homorazzi.com calling the show "very clever and entertaining" with "fresh ideas" while Blouin ArtInfo called the series "gutsy satire that deserves more attention" and praised Woods' performance in particular saying "Woods deserves a bigger stage".

On November 6, 2013, it was confirmed that the TV series would return for a second season in the summer of 2014 and include an additional digital companion project. Season 2 debuted on September 8, 2014.

All 12 episodes were released on the show's website for a limited time worldwide on June 1, 2015.

Episode list

References

2010s Canadian LGBT-related comedy television series
2013 Canadian television series debuts
2014 Canadian television series endings
2010s Canadian comedy television series
OutTV (Canadian TV channel) original programming